Esmeralda is a Brazilian telenovela produced and broadcast by SBT in 2004 and 2005. It was based on the 1970 Venezuelan telenovela of same name by Delia Fiallo.

Cast 

 Bianca Castanho as Esmeralda Álvares Real
 Cláudio Lins as José Armando Álvares Real
 Tânia Bondezan as Fátima Álvares Real
 Karina Barum as Graziella Álvares Real
 Daniel Andrade as Adrián Lucero
 Lucinha Lins as Branca Álvares Real
 Paulo César Grande as Rodolfo Álvares Real
 Manoelita Lustosa as Rosário
 Sônia Guedes as Margarida
 Delano Avelar as Dr. Lúcio Malavér
 Olivetti Herrera as Dr. Álvaro Lafaieti
 Cleide Queiroz as Emanuela
 Josmar Martins as Firmino
 Jardel Mello as Dionísio Lucero
 Marco Lunez as Januário
 Carol Hubner as Joana
 Cyda Baú as Jacinta
 Pedro Paulley as Inácio
 Priscila Ferreira as Florysa "Florzinha" Lucero
 Antônio Petrin as Sabiá
 Fabiana Alvarez as Patrícia
 Renato Scarpin as Dr. Marcelo
 Nara Gomes as Socorro
 Graça Berman as Hortência
 Cris Bessa as Aurora
 Mário Sérgio Pretini as Dr. Bernardo
 Carl Schumacher as Dr. Fausto
 Luís Carlos Bahia as Cláudio
 Débora Gomez as Dóris
 Domingos Meira as Daniel
 Ruth Roncy as Betânia
 Patrícia Vilela as Hilda
 Maria Estela as Irmã Piedade
 Patrícia Salvador as Pietra
 Daniela Franco as Márcia
 Bibi Menegon as Amélia
 Tallyta Cardoso as Tânia
 Fabiana Meireles as Irmã Lucila
 Nirce Levin as Rita
 João Bourbonnais as Gustavo

Other versions 
  Esmeralda - a Venezuelan telenovela produced by José Enrique Crousillat for Venevisión in 1970.
  Topacio - a Venezuelan telenovela produced by Jorge Gherardi and Omar Pin for RCTV in 1984.
  Esmeralda - a Mexican telenovela produced by Salvador Mejía Alejandre for Televisa in 1997.
  Sin tu mirada - In 2017 Televisa returned to make another more modern version of the story.

References

External links 
  
 

2004 telenovelas
Brazilian telenovelas
2004 Brazilian television series debuts
2005 Brazilian television series endings
Sistema Brasileiro de Televisão telenovelas
Brazilian television series based on Mexican television series
Portuguese-language telenovelas